Martin Pušić (born 24 October 1987) is an Austrian professional footballer of Croatian origin who plays as a forward.

Club career

Early career in Austria
Pušić began his career in the youth team of Austria Wien. In 2004, he crossed the city to join First Vienna FC, with whom he made his professional debut in 2005 in the Austrian Regional League. His performances attracted attention from higher divisions, and in 2007 he made a switch to SK Schwadorf in the First League, the second tier of the Austrian pyramid.

In the summer of 2008, SK Schwadorf and VfB Admira Wacker Mödling merged to form the new FC Admira Wacker Mödling, and Pušić became a regular player on their left wing. In 2008–09 he managed to make 24 league appearances, scoring 7 goals. The team also reached the 2009 Austrian Cup Final, which they lost 3–1 to the club where he began his career, Austria Wien.

On 8 August 2010, he signed with SC Rheindorf Altach, initially for only half a season but with an option to extend the contract through to the end of the 2010–11 season.

Hull City
In July 2011, he began a trial with English Championship team Hull City. He played his first game for the club on 27 July 2011; a 3–1 win over Yorkshire rivals Bradford City, Pusic scored the final goal of the match. On 9 August 2011, the club announced that Pušić had signed a deal until the end of the 2011–12 season. He went on to make his debút on the same day in a 2–0 loss at home to Macclesfield Town in the League Cup First Round tie.
He made his league debut on 1 October 2011 at the KC Stadium, in a 2–1 win against Cardiff City.

After injuries stalled his progression, Pušić was released from his contract at the KC Stadium on 9 January 2012.

Years in Norway
On 18 March 2012, he signed a one-year contract with the Norwegian club Vålerenga. He became the match winner in his first game, against FK Haugesund. However, after only five months in the club, his contract was mutually terminated by both parts. Vålerenga manager Martin Andresen stated that the termination came as a result of Pušić's unwillingness to sign a new contract with the club, combined with the fact that the club had a full foreign player quota.

On 30 August 2012, the same day he was released by Vålerenga, he signed a short-term contract until the end of the season with the Norwegian club Fredrikstad in hope that he could save them from relegation. Although he stepped up the challenge and was hyped by the Norwegian media as Fredrikstad's potential saviour, the club was relegated in the final match of the season, losing 2–0 at home against Molde. His short-term contract expired shortly after, and was not renewed as Pušić himself did not want to play in the Adeccoliga.

On 17 January 2013, he signed with a third Norwegian club, Brann on a free transfer. He was signed as a striker to replace Brann's previous season's top scorer Kim Ojo, following his transfer to the Belgian club KRC Genk.

Top scorer in Denmark
On 16 January 2014, he signed a three-year contract with the Danish club Esbjerg fB for an unknown fee. During his first season at the club, Pušić made 12 league appearances, scoring 5 goals.

Halfway through the 2014–15 Danish Superliga, Pušić was sold to FC Midtjylland, for a reported fee of 7.5 million Danish kroner (approximately £0,9 million). Ultimately, Pušić scored 17 goals during the season and finished as the league overall top scorer, while Midtjylland won the championship for the first time in its history.

In 2015–16, Pušić was a regular starter as Midtjylland finished third in the league. He played 25 competitive games and scored 13 goals. He was, however, deemed surplus to requirements during the following season and joined the Dutch Eredivisie club Sparta Rotterdam on a half year loan on 28 January 2017.

On 26 August 2017, Pušić signed a one-year contract with the Danish defending champions F. C. Copenhagen.

On 15 July 2018, AC Horsens announced they had signed Pušić on a free transfer and handed him a two-year deal. Four days later, on 19 July 2018, this deal was annulled on Pušić's request.

Pušić joined 3. Liga club TSV 1860 Munich on a one-year contract in summer 2020. He agreed the termination of his contract in December due to personal issues, having made 8 appearances for the club.

International career
Whilst playing for Vienna in 2007, Pušić was called up to the Austrian U-20 squad in preparation for the U-20 World Cup in Canada and played his first and, to date, only international game for the Austrian U-20 team. He ultimately failed to make the squad for the tournament, and was not part of the team which went on to finish fourth.

Career statistics

Honours
 U-19 Championship First Vienna FC

References

External links

1987 births
Living people
Footballers from Vienna
Association football forwards
Austrian footballers
Austria youth international footballers
Austrian people of Croatian descent
2. Liga (Austria) players
Austrian Regionalliga players
Eliteserien players
Danish Superliga players
Eredivisie players
3. Liga players
First Vienna FC players
FC Wacker Innsbruck (2002) players
FK Austria Wien players
SC Rheindorf Altach players
Hull City A.F.C. players
Vålerenga Fotball players
Fredrikstad FK players
SK Brann players
Esbjerg fB players
FC Midtjylland players
Sparta Rotterdam players
F.C. Copenhagen players
Aarhus Gymnastikforening players
AC Horsens players
SV Mattersburg players
TSV 1860 Munich players
Austrian expatriate footballers
Expatriate footballers in England
Austrian expatriate sportspeople in England
Expatriate footballers in Norway
Austrian expatriate sportspeople in Norway
Expatriate men's footballers in Denmark
Austrian expatriate sportspeople in Denmark
Expatriate footballers in the Netherlands
Austrian expatriate sportspeople in the Netherlands
Expatriate footballers in Germany
Austrian expatriate sportspeople in Germany